The Sale is a concept album by the American Rock band Crack the Sky. The album was released on November 23, 2007 by Aluminum Cat Recordings and this is their thirteenth studio album.

Track listing

Personnel

The band
John Palumbo (Vocal/Guitar)
Rick Witkowski (Guitar/Vocal)
Dougie Bryan (Background Vocals)
Bobby Hird (Guitar/Vocal)
Joe Macre (Bass/Vocal)
John Tracey (Drums)
Glen Workman (Keyboard)

Other
Dan Stover (Photography)
Doug Milton (Mastering)

2004 albums
Crack the Sky albums